Thomas Köhler (born June 17, 1967) is a German former footballer who is now goalkeeper coach of Dynamo Dresden.

External links

1967 births
Living people
German footballers
East German footballers
Association football goalkeepers
FC Rot-Weiß Erfurt players
Dynamo Dresden players
FC Hansa Rostock players
FC Sachsen Leipzig players
FC Energie Cottbus players
DDR-Oberliga players